The Gold Standard (GS), or Gold Standard for the Global Goals, is a standard and logo certification mark program for non-governmental emission reductions projects in the Clean Development Mechanism (CDM), the Voluntary Carbon Market and other climate and development interventions. It is published and administered by the Gold Standard Foundation, a non-profit foundation headquartered in Geneva, Switzerland. It was designed with an intent to ensure that carbon credits are real and verifiable and that projects make measurable contributions to sustainable development. The objective of the GS is to add branding, with a quality label, to carbon credits generated by projects which can then be bought and traded by countries that have a binding legal commitment according to the Kyoto Protocol, businesses or other organizations for carbon offsetting purposes.

History 
The Gold Standard for CDM (GS CER) was developed in 2003 by World Wide Fund for Nature (WWF), South North, and Helio International. The Voluntary Gold Standard (GS VER), a standard for use within the voluntary carbon market, was launched in May 2006. The programs were created following a 12-month consultation period that included workshops and web-based consultation conducted by an independent standards advisory board composed of non-governmental organizations (NGOs), scientists, project developers and government representatives.

The Gold Standard certification program is open to any non-government, community-based organization, especially those with an interest in the promotion of sustainable development or a focus on climate and energy issues. As of October 2018, more than 80 non-profit organizations internationally had officially endorsed the Gold Standard program.

The program is administered by the Gold Standard Foundation, a non-profit foundation under Swiss law that is headquartered in Geneva, Switzerland. It also employs local experts in Brazil, India and South Africa.

In July 2008 the Gold Standard Version 2.0 was released with sets of guidelines and manuals on the GS requirements, toolkits and other supporting documents to be used by project developers and DOEs. This relegated the previously applicable manuals to Version 1.0. The Version 2.0 also supports Program of Activities (PoA).

In July 2017, a new version called the Gold Standard for the Global Goals was released, superseding previous Gold Standards.

Scholarly recognition and criticisms 
The Gold Standard is recognized by carbon market and climate change politics scholars as a prime example of voluntary standards. As a program certifying emissions trading programs, criticisms of the general practice of emissions trading may also generally apply to the Gold Standard certification program.

Eligibility 
To be eligible for Gold Standard Certification, a project must:

 Be a Gold Standard-approved Renewable Energy Supply or End use Energy Efficiency, Afforestation/Reforestation or Agriculture project type
 Be reducing one of the three eligible Green House Gases: Carbon Dioxide (CO2), Methane (CH4) and Nitrous Oxide (N2O)
 Not employ Official Development Assistance (ODA) under the condition that the credits coming out of the project are transferred to the donor country
 Not be applying for other certifications, to ensure there is no double counting of credits
 Demonstrate its additionality by using the United Nations Framework Convention on Climate Change's (UNFCCC) Large Scale Additionality Tool; and show that the project is not a 'business-as-usual' scenario
 Make a net-positive contribution to the economic, environmental and social welfare of the local population that hosts it, in the form of contributions to a minimum of three Sustainable Development Goals (SDGs)

The Gold Standard Registry 

Status of projects that apply for Gold Standard can be tracked on its registry.  Project Developers, Designated Operational Entities (DOEs) (also known as Validators),  Traders and Buyers of credits can open accounts with the registry. There are various publicly available reports .

See also
 Climate, Community & Biodiversity Alliance
 Verified Carbon Standard

References

External links 
 Gold Standard organization
 FAQ: Gold Standard for the Global Goals
 Gold Standard for the Global Goals, standard documents

Certification marks
Carbon finance